Events in the year 1979 in Mexico.

Incumbents

Federal government
 President: José López Portillo
 Interior Secretary (SEGOB): Jesús Reyes Heroles/Enrique Olivares Santana 
 Secretary of Foreign Affairs (SRE): Santiago Roel García/Jorge Castañeda y Álvarez 
 Communications Secretary (SCT): Emilio Mújica Montoya
 Secretary of Defense (SEDENA): Félix Galván López
 Secretary of Navy: Ricardo Cházaro Lara
 Secretary of Labor and Social Welfare: Pedro Ojeda Paullada
 Secretary of Welfare: Pedro Ramírez Vázquez
 Secretary of Public Education: Fernando Solana Morales
 Tourism Secretary (SECTUR): Guillermo Rossell de la Lama

Supreme Court

 President of the Supreme Court: Agustín Téllez Cruces

Governors

 Aguascalientes: José Refugio Esparza Reyes
 Baja California: Roberto de la Madrid
 Baja California Sur: Angel César Mendoza Arámburo
 Campeche: Rafael Rodríguez Barrera/Eugenio Echeverría Castellot
 Chiapas: Salomón González Blanco
 Chihuahua: Manuel Bernardo Aguirre
 Coahuila: Oscar Flores Tapia
 Colima: Salvador Gámiz Fernández/Griselda Álvarez
 Durango: Héctor Mayagoitia Domínguez/Salvador Gámiz Fernández
 Guanajuato: Enrique Velasco Ibarra/Luis H. Ducoing Gamba
 Guerrero: Flavio Romero de Velasco
 Hidalgo: Rubén Figueroa Figueroa
 Jalisco: Flavio Romero de Velasco
 State of Mexico: Jorge Jiménez Cantú 
 Michoacán: Carlos Torres Manzo
 Morelos: Armando León Bejarano (PRI)
 Nayarit: Rogelio Flores Curiel
 Nuevo León: Pedro Zorrilla Martínez
 Oaxaca: Eliseo Jiménez Ruiz
 Puebla: Toxqui Fernández de Lara
 Querétaro: Rafael Camacho Guzmán
 Quintana Roo: Jesús Martínez Ross
 San Luis Potosí: Carlos Jonguitud Barrios
 Sinaloa: Alfonso G. Calderón
 Sonora: Alejandro Carrillo Marcor
 Tabasco: Leandro Rovirosa Wade
 Tamaulipas: Enrique Cárdenas González	
 Tlaxcala: Emilio Sánchez Piedras
 Veracruz: Rafael Hernández Ochoa
 Yucatán: Francisco Luna Kan
 Zacatecas: Fernando Pámanes Escobedo
Regent of Mexico City: Carlos Hank González

Events

 Museo Rufino Tamayo in Oaxaca opens.
 Colegio Alemán de Guadalajara founded. 
 University of the Cloister of Sor Juana established.
 February 5: Roman Catholic Diocese of Cuautitlán established.  
 June 3: Ixtoc I oil spill 
 July 1: 1979 Mexican legislative election 
 September 14–21: Hurricane Henri (1979) 
 October 31: Western Airlines Flight 2605

Awards
Belisario Domínguez Medal of Honor – Fidel Velázquez Sánchez

Film

 List of Mexican films of 1979

Sport

 1978–79 Mexican Primera División season. 
 Ángeles de Puebla win the Mexican League.
 1979 Summer Universiade in Mexico City. 
 1979 Central American and Caribbean Championships in Athletics  in Guadalajara. 
 Club de Fútbol Oaxtepec founded.

Births
March 16: Adriana Fonseca, actress and dancer.
July 23: Perro Aguayo Jr., pro wrestler (d. March 21, 2015).
September 25: Karla Luna, actress (Las Lavanderas) and singer (d. September 28, 2017).
November 19: Michelle Vieth, American born Mexican actress and model. 
December 23: Jacqueline Bracamontes, Mexican actress and beauty contest winner (Nuestra Belleza México 2000).
December 29: Diego Luna, actor, director, producer

Deaths
January 18 — María Dolores Izaguirre de Ruiz, First Lady of Mexico (1952-1958) (b. 1891)
 July 15 — Gustavo Díaz Ordaz Bolaños, President of Mexico 1964-1970 (b. 1911)

References

External links

 
Mexico